Argyria croceicinctella is a moth in the family Crambidae. It was described by Francis Walker in 1863. It is found in Venezuela and Peru.

References

Argyriini
Moths described in 1863
Moths of South America